Porridge Radio are a British indie rock band formed in Brighton in 2015. They are fronted by vocalist, songwriter and lead guitarist Dana Margolin. The other members are keyboardist Georgie Stott, bass guitarist Maddie Ryall and drummer Sam Yardley.

The Guardian listed them among their top 40 new artists of 2018 and described their music as 'slacker indie'.

They performed a live session for Marc Riley's show on BBC Radio 6 Music in May 2019 and again in February 2020.

They announced signing to US independent label Secretly Canadian in December 2019. In January 2020, they announced their second album and their label debut, Every Bad, which was released on 13 March 2020 to critical acclaim. Later that year they released three singles; "Good For You" was co-released on 2 July 2020 with the artist Lala Lala, "7 Seconds" was released on 14 September 2020, and "The Last Time I Saw You (O Christmas)" was released on 8 December 2020.

Formation

Porridge Radio was started by Dana Margolin, who prior to starting the band was attending open mics and songwriting in her bedroom. She formed Porridge Radio as a way to express herself by using inspiration from the sea and her seaside home of Brighton. The band was formed with Maddie Ryall on bass, Georgie Stott on keyboard, and Sam Yardley on drums.

Discography

Albums

 Misery Radio (Eyeless, May 2015)
 I'm Not Sure Anymore (self-released, December 2015)
 Hello Dog Friendly (Split album with West America; Memorials of Distinction, January 2016)
 Rice, Pasta and Other Fillers (Memorials of Distinction, August 2016)
 Every Bad (Secretly Canadian, March 2020)
 Waterslide, Diving Board, Ladder to the Sky (Secretly Canadian, May 2022) – No. 39 UK

Singles
 "O Christmas" (Art Is Hard, December 2017)
 "Give/Take" (Memorials of Distinction, April 2019)
 "Don't Ask Me Twice" (Memorials of Distinction, May 2019)
 "Lilac" (Secretly Canadian, December 2019)
"Good For You (with Lala Lala)" (Secretly Canadian, July 2020) 
 "7 Seconds" (Secretly Canadian, September 2020)
 "Back to the Radio" (Secretly Canadian, February 2022)
 "The Rip" (Secretly Canadian, May 2022)

Awards and nominations

References

Secretly Canadian artists
Lo-fi music groups
Musical groups from Brighton and Hove